Knitting Under the Influence is a 2006 novel written by author Claire Scovell LaZebnik about three girls in their late twenties who have a weekly knitting circle, yet, they all have busy individual lives.  The knitting circle is the only way these girls can stay connected with each other.

Plot summary
Sometimes it feels like their weekly knitting circle is the only thing that keeps Kathleen, Sari, and Lucy from falling apart.  Their fine-gauge scarves may look fabulous, but their lives are starting to unravel...

For years, beautiful, flighty Kathleen has been living off of her famous actress sisters.  When she moves out, she misses her life of luxury and begins to think that marrying rich might be an easy way to get it back.

Lucy is dating the man of her dreams-gorgeous, a brilliant scientist, going places-but when an animal rights group targets him, she wonders whose side she's really on.

And Sari finds herself suddenly face-to-face again with the "it" boy from high school who still has "it"- he's gorgeous, sensitive, and kind, and he has a son who needs Sari's help.  But can she ever forgive him for what he did to her brother a decade ago?

Caught between life, love, and pursuit of the perfect cast-on, these three friends learn that there are never any easy answers, except maybe one-that when the going gets tough, the tough gets knitting.

Quotes
"Jane Austen invented 'chick lit' (if that term means witty novels that closely observe  the details that matter to women), and this intelligent, hilarious book is peopled with wise yet flawed women who, like the best of Austen's heroines, always choose love over 'marrying well.'"                                                                -Cathryn Michon, author of The Grrl Genius Guide to Life
"Filled with lovable characters, KNITTING UNDER THE  INFLUENCE is a warm, witty, and absolutely intoxicating read."                                                                               -Sarah Mlynowski, author of Milkrun and Me vs. Me

Reception
Romantic Books panned Knitting Under the Influence by saying the book was slow and "turned into a burdensome cliche".

References

External links
 Knitting Under the Influence Page on Claire LaZebnik Website

2006 novels
Knitting publications